Le Nouvelliste is a French-language daily newspaper printed in Port-au-Prince, Haiti, and distributed throughout the country, particularly the capital and 18 of the country's major cities.

The paper was founded in 1898 by Guillaume Chéraquit originally under the name Le Matin, to become Le Nouvelliste 15 months later. Printing was entrusted to Chéraquit's friend Henri Chauvet.  Today Le Nouvelliste is Haiti's oldest and largest daily newspaper.

See also
 List of newspapers in Haiti
 Media of Haiti

External links
Historical issues of Le Nouvelliste in the Digital Library of the Caribbean

French-language newspapers published in North America
Newspapers published in Haiti
Publications established in 1898
1898 establishments in Haiti